William Ramsey Laird III (June 2, 1916 – January 7, 1974) was a United States senator from West Virginia. Born in Keswick, California, he was educated in the public schools. He graduated from Greenbrier Military School, King College (in Bristol, Tennessee) and from West Virginia University in 1944. During the Second World War he served in the United States Navy. He was admitted to the bar in 1944 and commenced the practice of law in West Virginia; he was a member of West Virginia Board of Education in 1955 and a member of the board of directors of Merchants National Bank, Montgomery, West Virginia and the Upper Kanawha Valley Development Association. He was a member of the board of trustees of the Laird Foundation in Montgomery and was State tax commissioner in 1955–1956, when he resigned, having been appointed to the U.S. Senate on March 13, 1956, to fill the vacancy caused by the death of Harley M. Kilgore. A Democrat, he served from March 13, 1956, to November 6, 1956. He did not sign the 1956 Southern Manifesto. He was not a candidate for election to fill the vacancy and resumed the practice of law in Fayetteville and Montgomery.

Laird died in Montgomery in 1974; his remains were interred in Huse Memorial Park, Fayetteville.

He had three children, including William Laird IV.

References

1916 births
1974 deaths
Military personnel from West Virginia
United States Navy personnel of World War II
Democratic Party United States senators from West Virginia
Greenbrier Military School alumni
People from Montgomery, West Virginia
People from Shasta County, California
United States Navy sailors
West Virginia Democrats
West Virginia lawyers
West Virginia University alumni
20th-century American politicians
20th-century American lawyers